Jing'an station may refer to:

 Jingan metro station, in New Taipei, Taiwan served by Taipei Metro.
 Jing'an station (Nanjing Metro), on the planned Line S5 (Nanjing Metro) in Jiangsu province, China.